Big Head Todd and The Monsters are a rock band formed by Todd Mohr, Brian Nevin, and Rob Squires in 1986 in Colorado.  The band has released a number of albums since 1989 with their 1993 album Sister Sweetly going platinum in the United States. The band has developed a sizable live following especially in the Mountain States of the United States.

Career
Their lineup changed in 1986 after Christerson left the band and was replaced on bass by Rob Squires. The trio had attended Columbine High School together. Mohr attended Colorado State University in Fort Collins, Colorado and transferred to the University of Colorado to join Nevin and Squires. The three began touring clubs in Denver, Fort Collins, and Boulder as Big Head Todd and the Monsters in 1987. The band soon built up a following throughout Colorado and the West. They toured extensively throughout the Mountain States and West Coast of the United States in their van dubbed "The Colonel", which was driven more than 400,000 miles.

In 1989, the band formed Big Records and released its first album Another Mayberry that same year. Midnight Radio was released the following year, and featured artwork from Chris Mars of The Replacements. By 1993, Big Head Todd and the Monsters had developed a considerable live following across the United States. Their first live album Big Head Todd and the Monsters Live was recorded at the H.O.R.D.E. Festival in 1993.

The group signed with Giant Records in 1993 and recorded Sister Sweetly with Prince associate David Z producing. This album went platinum and spawned three singles that made the rock charts, including "Bittersweet," "Broken Hearted Savior" and "Circle."

Mohr produced the next album Strategem released in 1994. It reached No. 30 on the Billboard 200, but did not sell as well as its predecessors.

Their song "In the Morning" was featured in the 1994 film Blown Away. The band contributed "Tangerine" to the 1995 Led Zeppelin tribute album Encomium: A Tribute to Led Zeppelin.

Jerry Harrison, formerly of the Talking Heads, produced the next album, Beautiful World, released in 1997. John Lee Hooker was recording an album in the same studio and played with the band on a version of his best-known song "Boom Boom". Squires described the recording of the track on the band's website. "Hooker has just this incredible presence. He walked into the room and literally everyone was intimidated including our producer and the people who work in the studio." Bernie Worrell, formerly of P-Funk, played some keyboards on the album's title track "Beautiful World". Corey Mauser filled out the other key parts on the album. The album spawned two hit singles on the rock charts, "Boom Boom" and "Resignation Superman." The Live Monsters album followed in 1998.

In 2002, the group released the follow-up studio album Riviera. As Giant Records had closed its doors, the self-produced album was released through Big Records with distribution through Warner Music. Crimes of Passion was released in 2004 with Sanctuary Records distributing it. Another live album Live at the Fillmore was released in 2004.

In 2005, the group joined the growing trend of Internet-based music sales by releasing the single "Blue Sky" exclusively on iTunes. The song was written at the request of crewmembers of the Space Shuttle Discovery for their STS-114 Return to Flight mission in 2005, the first mission after the Columbia disaster. "Blue Sky" was written and performed as a tribute to all the people involved in the American space program. The song was used as Senator Hillary Clinton's presidential campaign song in 2008, and in the introduction of Clinton on her keynote address to the Democratic National Convention in 2008.  "Blue Sky" was also performed acoustically on March 8, 2011 at Johnson Space Center as the first live version of a wake-up call to Space Shuttle Discovery during the STS-133 mission.

In June 2007 BHTM recorded their annual charity show to raise money for autism research at the Red Rocks Amphitheater in Colorado. The recordings were sold on USB flash drives at the merchandise stands following the performance.

BHTM toured in the summer of 2008. This extended tour was in support of the July release of their 8th studio album All The Love You Need.

In 2010, Big Head Todd and the Monsters again returned to the studio to record Rocksteady. This featured "Beast of Burden" by The Rolling Stones and "Smokestack Lightning" by Howlin' Wolf.

The band returned to the studio again in 2011 to record a new project under the name Big Head Blues Club. The album 100 Years of Robert Johnson celebrates the songs of the late blues singer and musician Robert Johnson. The members of Big Head Todd and the Monsters were accompanied by B. B. King, Charlie Musselwhite, Cedric Burnside, David "Honeyboy" Edwards, Hubert Sumlin, Ruthie Foster, and Lightnin' Malcolm. Big Head Todd and the Monsters have also played shows under the name Big Head Blues Club, and have invited some of the legends featured on the album to perform with them.

They performed in the Denver Broncos Super Bowl 50 Championship Parade and in Indianapolis at the Vogue on February 9, 2016, using the Instagram hashtag #denver2indy to celebrate the dual event.

On November 3, 2017 the band released its 11th studio album, New World Arisin.

Lineup

Jeremy Lawton – keyboards, pedal steel guitar, vocals
Todd Park Mohr – vocals, guitar, keyboards, saxophone, harmonica
Brian Nevin– drums, percussion, vocals
Rob Squires – bass guitar, vocals

Touring:
 Hazel Miller – vocals

Discography

Studio albums
Another Mayberry (1989)
Midnight Radio (1990)
Sister Sweetly (1993)
Strategem (1994)
Beautiful World (1997)
Riviera (2002)
Crimes of Passion (2004)
All the Love You Need (2007)
Rocksteady (2010)
100 Years of Robert Johnson (2011) [credited to artist Big Head Blues Club]
Black Beehive (2014)
Way Down Inside: Songs of Willie Dixon (2016) [credited to artist Big Head Blues Club]
New World Arisin''' (2017)

Live albumsLive Monsters (1998)Live at the Fillmore (2004)Red Rocks (2009)Live at Red Rocks (2015)Live at the Belly Up (2020)We're Gonna Play It Anyway- Red Rocks 2020 (2020)

Compilation albumsFrom the Archives (2007) [outtakes album]

Charting albums
The following albums have charted on the Billboard album charts:Sister Sweetly – No. 1 Billboard Heatseeker; No. 117 Billboard 200Strategem – No. 30 Billboard 200Beautiful World – No. 54 Billboard 200Riviera – No. 166 Billboard 200; No. 2 Internet AlbumsCrimes of Passion'' – No. 253 Internet Albums

Charting singles

Other appearances

References

External links

Big Head Todd and the Monsters collection at the Internet Archive's live music archive
Feature interview with Todd Mohr from HonestTune.com

NCIS: New Orleans
American alternative rock groups
American blues rock musical groups
American country rock groups
Rock music groups from Colorado
Columbine High School alumni
Jam bands
Giant Records (Warner) artists
Musical groups established in 1986
Culture of Boulder, Colorado
University of Colorado alumni
1986 establishments in Colorado